The Krivaja is a river in northern Serbia. With the length of  it is the longest river that flows completely within the borders of Serbian province of Vojvodina.

Upper Course 

The Krivaja springs out in the Subotička Peščara, from the several streams which meet southwest of the village of Žednik. The longest stream originates from Pavlovac hillock (Serbian Cyrillic: Павловац) northeast of Bajmok, one of the most populous villages in Vojvodina. The stream passes between the village of Đurđin and Jaramazov hillock (Јарамазов) before it meets the shorter, northern stream (already named the Krivaja) and continues to the south.

The river passes next to the villages of Mali Beograd and Zobnatica, a tourist resort and site of the famous stud-farm, before it reaches the town of Bačka Topola. 

Lower Course 

The river turns west after the Bačka Topola and then turns sharply again to the southeast, near the village of Bajša and all three settlements that constitute the municipality of Mali Iđoš: the small town of Mali Iđoš and the villages of Lovćenac and Feketić. Total meandering ratio of the whole river is 65:109 (in the valley 15:33), thus the name (Krivaja; Serbian for winding river). The village of Turija stands on the Krivaja's mouth into the canal, at an altitude of 76 m.

Pollution 

A 20 years-long survey by the Serbian Environmental Protection Agency, published in 2019, showed that rivers in Vojvodina are the most polluted in Serbia. Of 10 most polluted rivers, 9 were from Vojvodina and total of 79% specimen from Vojvodina's rivers had "very bad results". Krivaja is especially polluted in the lower section, downstream from Bačka Topola, and has been "ecological black spot" for years. Water is used for city's industry. Additionally, the dam upstream holds more water for farm irrigation during summers than it should, so the river is turned into the slow open sewage canal.

The river is almost disappearing, being colloquially called "Nemaja" ("No river"). The frogs disappeared while flies and mosquitos thrive. Representative of the farm said "we call them to regulate the dam when the water level is insufficient, which they always so. What happens below the dam, we don't know". "Vojvodina Vode" claimed they have a project of another reservoir, at Srbobran, which will solve the problem. Local environmentalists are not convinced as previous solution by the company, dredging of the river, was fatal for the wildlife.

See also

Geography of Serbia
Geography of Vojvodina

References

Sources

 Mala Prosvetina Enciklopedija, Third edition (1985); Prosveta; 
 Jovan Đ. Marković (1990): Enciklopedijski geografski leksikon Jugoslavije Svjetlost-Sarajevo; 

Rivers of Serbia
Geography of Vojvodina
Bačka